Satish Chandra Kaushik (13 April 1956 – 9 March 2023) was an Indian actor, director, producer, comedian, and screenwriter. He found his fame in Bollywood with Mr India starring Anil Kapoor, Sridevi and Amrish Puri. He played the iconic character of a cook named Calendar. He was also an Assistant Director in the film.

Early life
Kaushik was born in Mahendragarh, Haryana on 13 April 1956. He graduated from Kirori Mal College, Delhi University in 1972. He was an alumnus of National School of Drama and Film and Television Institute of India.

Career
As a film actor, he was noted for his roles as "Calendar" in Mr. India, as Pappu Pager in Deewana Mastana, and as "Chanu Ahmed" in Sarah Gavron's British film Brick Lane (2007). He won the Filmfare Best Comedian Award twice: in 1990 for Ram Lakhan and in 1997 for Saajan Chale Sasural.

As a theatre actor, his most noted role was that of "Willy Loman" in the Hindi-language play, Salesman Ramlal, an adaptation of Arthur Miller's Death of a Salesman. Kaushik wrote dialogues for Kundan Shah's comedy classic Jaane Bhi Do Yaaron (1983). His 2009 film Teree Sang, starring Ruslaan Mumtaz and Sheena Shahabadi, explores issues of teen pregnancy. His first film as a director was Sridevi's Roop Ki Rani Choron Ka Raja (1993). His second was Prem (1995), which was supposed to be Tabu's inaugural film. Both were box office disasters. He continued to make films and got his first hit with Hum Aapke Dil Mein Rehte Hain in 1999.

He co-wrote and anchored a TV countdown show, Philips Top Ten, for which he won the Screen Videocon Award. In 2005, Kaushik directed Arjun Rampal, Amisha Patel, and Zayed Khan in Vaada. In 2007 Kaushik, together with Anupam Kher, who had been his classmate at NSD, launched a new film company called Karol Bagh Productions. Their first film, Teree Sang, was directed by Satish Kaushik.

His next work was to be based on the life of Tansen, in which the role of Tansen will be played by Abhishek Bachchan, and the soundtrack will be composed by Ravindra Jain; the script for the film is still being finished. Kaushik was working to promote Haryana's film industry, and was committed to make several films there. Kaushik decided to make a sequel of his hit movie Tere Naam (2003), Tere Naam 2.

Chandigarh film city project 
Kaushik was a partner in the Chandigarh film city project with real estate company Parsavnath Developers. They bought a  plot in Sarangpur Village, Chandigarh for little money, but they were forced to give up the project after foul play was exposed by media.

Personal life and death
Kaushik married Shashi in 1985. Their son died in 1996 at age two. In 2012, their daughter was born through a surrogate mother.

Kaushik died of a heart attack in Gurugram on 9 March 2023, at the age of 66. In his last Instagram post, he was seen celebrating Holi 2023 at the house of Javed Akhtar and Shabana Azmi.

Filmography

References

External links

 
 

1956 births
2023 deaths
Indian male film actors
Film directors from Haryana
Hindi-language film directors
Male actors in Hindi cinema
Indian male stage actors
Film and Television Institute of India alumni
National School of Drama alumni
Filmfare Awards winners
Delhi University alumni
Male actors from Haryana
People from Mahendragarh district
20th-century Indian film directors
21st-century Indian film directors
Hindi film producers
20th-century Indian male actors
21st-century Indian male actors